Pimenteira is an extinct and poorly attested Cariban language.

References

Cariban languages
Extinct languages